Events in the year 1987 in Bulgaria.

Incumbents 

 General Secretaries of the Bulgarian Communist Party: Todor Zhivkov
 Chairmen of the Council of Ministers: Georgi Atanasov

Events

Sports 

 The 1987 World Rhythmic Gymnastics Championships were held in Varna, Bulgaria from September 17 to September 20.

References 

 
1980s in Bulgaria
Years of the 20th century in Bulgaria
Bulgaria
Bulgaria